Penance Pass in the McMurdo Dry Valleys is the lowest, and easternmost, pass from Shangri-la to the Miers Valley. Named by the New Zealand Victoria University of Wellington Antarctic Expedition (VUWAE), 1960–61.

Mountain passes of Victoria Land
Scott Coast